The Plan may refer to:

Music
The Plan (band), Swedish rock group
Der Plan, a German electronic music group
The Plan (Hillsong album), a 1998 Hillsong Music album
The Plan (Tubeway Army album), an album of early demos and singles by Gary Numan's band Tubeway Army
The Plan (The Osmonds album), a 1973 album by The Osmonds
"The Plan" (Travis Scott song), 2020
"The Plan", a song by Built to Spill from the 1999 album Keep It Like a Secret
"The Plan", a song by G-Eazy from the 2017 album The Beautiful & Damned
"The Plan", a song by NOFX, B-side to "Timmy the Turtle"
"The Plan", a song by Prince from the 1996 album Emancipation
"The Plan", a song by Richard Hell and the Voidoids from the 1977 album Blank Generation
"The Plan", a song by Sunz of Man from the 1998 album The Last Shall Be First

Television and film 
Battlestar Galactica: The Plan, a 2009 direct-to-DVD movie (later shown on television) based on the 2004 TV series
The Plan (2014 film), a 2014 South Korean film
The Plan (2015 film), a 2015 Indian film
"The Plan" (Six Feet Under), a 2002 second season episode of the HBO series

Other uses 
The Plan (video game), a 2007 PlayStation 2 game by Crave Entertainment
The Plan (Washington, D.C.), a conspiracy theory regarding control of the city

See also
 Plan (disambiguation)
 Planner (disambiguation)